Krsta Cicvarić (September 14, 1879 – October 31, 1944) was a Serbian political activist and journalist. During the first decade of the 20th century, he espoused anarcho-syndicalist ideas. However, later in his life, Cicvarić was the editor of several openly antisemitic tabloid journals, and a Nazi collaborator.

He was executed on 31 October 1944 by the Yugoslav Partisans after the Belgrade Offensive.

Biography

Early life and education
Cicvarić was born on September 14, 1879 in the village of Nikojevići, near Užice, then part of the Principality of Serbia.

He attended the Gymnasium in Užice. He refused to attend religious classes and claimed to be an atheist and an unbeliever. Because of confrontations with his professor Nastas Petrović, a member of the People's Radical Party, who claimed Cicvarić's political views to be "demonic", he dropped out of the Užice Gymnasium in 1896. He soon left the city altogether and moved to Belgrade where he completed the Gymnasium and enrolled at the University of Belgrade's Faculty of Philosophy. Subsequently, he enrolled in the University of Vienna, but decided to leave his studies and return to Serbia where he became a journalist and anarchist activist.

Anarchist political activism
Cicvarić was arrested and imprisoned several times for his writings. In 1905 Vasilije Knežević, a member of Cicvarić's group the Equality Workers' Club (Radnički klub Jednakost) founded the anarchist newspaper Bread and Freedom (Hleb i sloboda). Soon after, Knežević started to pay heavy fines for the paper and was imprisoned due to his inability to cover his debts. In this period Cicvarić took over the paper. The paper had only three issues, and Knežević moved to Valjevo after serving his sentence, disillusioned with the anarchists Cicvarić and Petar Munjić. Cicvarić and Munjić later founded the anarchist paper Worker's Struggle (Radnička borba) in 1907. The paper was closed down after the events related to the strike led by sugar workers in Čukarica in February 1907. Cicvarić was imprisoned in Požarevac because of his writing and was later released during the Annexation Crisis in 1908.

In 1911 Cicvarić met Nedeljko Čabrinović who was working on the printing press owned by Živojin Dačić, where Civarić's paper the New Age (Novo vreme) was being printed. Cicvarić gave Čabrinović many books including all of his own works. Čabrinović later smuggled the books to Sarajevo where some were burned by his mother, while some were kept safe and were given to his friends as gifts. From 1911 to 1915, Cicvarić published the daily The Guard (Straža), the "free-minded organ of public thought".

Cicvarić was drafted during the Balkan wars. He is mentioned by Leon Trotsky in his war correspondence The Balkan Wars: 1912–13 as a "free anarchist" and publisher of The Guard, and as an outspoken critic of the Serbian Social Democratic Party. He writes "Since, in this little country, everyone knows everyone else and does not hesitate to poke his nose into the private lives of his political adversaries, the polemic against the leaders of Social Democracy is carried on in a form that would not bear translation into any European language". He was drafted again in World War I, and surrendered, becoming a prisoner of war of the Austro-Hungarian Empire in Neusiedl am See.

Tabloid journalism and Nazi collaboration
After World War I, he started writing for Belgrade Daily (Beogradski dnevnik), owned by Dušan Paranos and whose editor-in-chief was Mehmed Žunić. At first, he wrote introductory articles and was the chief polemicist. On 7 August 1922 he was signed as editor and director of the paper. From September 1922 on, the paper bore the title Krsta Cicvarić's Belgrade Daily (Beogradski dnevnik Krste Cicvarića). His main target were the Radicals, as well as Nikola Pašić and Stojan Protić as heads of the party. Pašić was a "thug", "scumbag", "villain" and, ultimately, "the most corrupt person in the entire history of Serbia", and when his son Radomir was beaten, Belgrade Daily wrote that "this act of the youth of the nation in Novi Sad is understandable and  must be fully approved". His journalistic writing style in the Kingdom of Yugoslavia was inflammatory, and his scandalous articles were criticized by many, so much that he was even compared with the influential American newspaper publisher William Randolph Hearst.

In 1929 Cicvarić started working in Balkan, owned by Svetolik Savić. Besides journalism, he sold herbs used for treating cancer, tuberculosis, epilepsy, and anthrax. Since Pašić had already died, Cicvarić's main target was president of the Croatian Peasant Party, Vlatko Maček who he calls a "Jewish bastard", and a "long-nose". In his text "To Serbs of the Faith of Moses" from 29 April 1936 Cicvarić writes that "the Jews have ruined our Slavic motherland, Russia, and have spread their evil across the world" and states support for Adolf Hitler.

He spent the final years of his life living in Belgrade, almost completely blind. From May 1940 to March 1941, Savić and Cicvarić published the New Balkan (Novi Balkan), an antisemitic paper sympathetic to Hitler. In 1944 he writes

Apprehension and death
Cicvarić was accused of collaborationism and shot without trial during the night between October 30 and 31, 1944. His burial site remains unknown.

Works
Cicvarić wrote only a couple of books in philosophy, and most of his works were political. He was a columnist in a lot of newspapers and was a fierce critic of the Serbian philosopher and scientist Branislav Petronijević. His entire life was devoted to writing books on anarchism and critique of the Western civilization. He was a fierce opponent of monarchism, communism, social democracy and imperialism.

 Iz аnarhističkog progrаmа, Novа štаmpаrijа S. Rаdenkovićа i Brаtа, Belgrade, 1909.
 Plаvа knjigа o srpskom pitаnju, Gecа Kon i Komp., Cetinje, 1909.
 Socijаlisti na vlаdi. Sv. 1, Štаmpаrijа D. Dimitrijevićа, Belgrade, 1909.
 Ideаlizаm ili mаterijаlizаm, s naročitim pogledom na filosofiju Brаnislаvа Petronijevićа, Štаmpаrijа Srbija, Belgrade, 1909.
 Kаko ćemo pobediti Austriju, Nаumović i Stefаnović, Belgrade, 1909.
 Anarhizаm i аnarhisti, Nаumović i Stefаnović, Belgrade, 1909.
 Dаrvin ili Lаmаrk, pаd dаrvinističke doktrine, Štаmpаrijа Srbija, Belgrade, 1910.
 Svetozаr Mаrković i birokrаtski sistem pred sudom Slobodаna Jovаnovićа, B. Dimitrijević, Belgrade, 1910.
 Socijаlizаm i bаlkаnskа konfederаcijа ili Jedаn krupаn uspeh srpske socijаlne demokrаtije, Štаmpаrijа Srbija, Belgrade, 1910.
 Srpskа socijаlna demokrаtijа na prekretu, Štаmpаrijа Petrа Munjićа i Komp., Belgrade, 1910.
 O Sаnjinu, odbrаna i kritikа, Štаmpаrijа Srbija, Belgrade, 1910.
 Demokrаtijа i socijаlizаm, kritički pogled na njihovu prаksu i njihovu teoriju, Izdаnje piščevo, Belgrade, 1910.
 Štа je metаfizikа, Štаmpаrijа Srbija, Belgrade, 1910.
 Stojаn Protić i naš novi ustаv, Beogrаdski dnevnik, Belgrade, 1919.

References

Further reading
 Simić, Aleksandar (November 1995). The Workers' Movement in Serbia and Ex-Yugoslavia. Požarevac: Revolutionary Group TORPEDO.
 
 
 
 

1879 births
1944 deaths
Writers from Užice
Serbian journalists
Serbian anarchists
Anarcho-syndicalists
University of Belgrade Faculty of Philosophy alumni
Royal Serbian Army soldiers
World War I prisoners of war held by Austria-Hungary
Serbia under German occupation
Serbian anti-communists
Serbian fascists
Serbian military personnel of the Balkan Wars
Executed Serbian collaborators with Nazi Germany
Serbian military personnel of World War I
Serbian conspiracy theorists
People killed by Yugoslav Partisans
People executed by Yugoslavia by firing squad